Kompatak SinbiMuayThai is a Thai Muay Thai fighter.

He was in the shortlist for the 2018-2019 Sports Writers of Thailand Fighter of the Year award

Titles and accomplishments
True4U Petchyindee
 2016 CP million Tournament 118 lbs Winner
 2022 True4U 130 lbs Champion (1 defense)

International Federation of Muaythai Associations
 2022 IFMA World Championships −60 kg 

Awards
Sports Authority of Thailand (SAT)
 2017 Preservation of Outstanding Muay Thai Technique Award

Fight record

|-  style="background:#fbb;"
| 2023-03-11|| Loss ||align=left| Petchdam Petchyindee Academy || RWS + Petchyindee, Rajadamnern Stadium || Bangkok, Thailand || Decision (Split) ||3  || 3:00

|-  style="background:#cfc;"
| 2023-01-28|| Win ||align=left| Tongnoi Wor.Sangprapai ||Suek Muay Mahakuson Samakom Chao Paktai  || Bangkok, Thailand || Decision||5 ||3:00  

|-  style="background:#cfc;"
| 2022-11-18 || Win ||align=left| Petchsukhumvit Boybangna || Ruamponkon + Prachin || Prachinburi province, Thailand || Decision || 5||3:00
|-  style="background:#fbb;"
| 2022-10-20 || Loss||align=left| Tongnoi Wor.Sangprapai || Petchyindee, Rajadamnern Stadium || Bangkok, Thailand || Decision ||  5||3:00
|-  style="background:#fbb;"
| 2022-09-18|| Loss ||align=left| Chorfah Tor.Sangtiennoi||  Suek Muay Thai Witee Tin Thai Muang Nam Dam || Kalasin province, Thailand || Decision (Split)|| 5||3:00
|-  style="background:#cfc"
| 2022-08-02 ||Win ||align=left| Kongthoranee Sor.Sommai || Birthday Pitaktham Super Fight || Songkhla province, Thailand ||Decision ||5 ||3:00 
|-  style="background:#cfc;"
| 2022-07-01 ||Win ||align=left| Samingdet Nor.Anuwatgym|| True4U Muaymanwansuk, Rangsit Stadium || Pathum Thani, Thailand || Decision ||5 ||3:00 
|-
! style=background:white colspan=9 |
|-  style="background:#cfc;"
| 2022-04-16||Win||align=left| Kongthoranee Sor.Sommai || Sor.Sommai + Pitaktham|| Phayao province, Thailand || Decision|| 5 ||3:00 
|-  style="background:#cfc;"
| 2022-03-25|| Win ||align=left| Chorfah Tor.Sangtiennoi|| Muaymanwansuk, Rangsit Stadium || Bangkok, Thailand || Decision||  5||3:00
|-  style="background:#fbb;"
| 2022-02-11 || Loss||align=left| Samingdet Nor.Anuwatgym|| True4U Muaymanwansuk, Rangsit Stadium || Pathum Thani, Thailand || Decision || 5|| 3:00 
|-
! style=background:white colspan=9 |

|-  style="background:#cfc;"
| 2021-11-26|| Win ||align=left| Chorfah Tor.Sangtiennoi || Muay Thai Moradok Kon Thai + Rajadamnern Super Fight || Buriram, Thailand || Decision || 5 || 3:00
|-  style="background:#fbb;"
| 2021-10-14|| Loss ||align=left| Kiewpayak Jitmuangnon || Petchyindee + Muay Thai Moradok Kon Thai || Buriram Province, Thailand || Decision || 5 || 3:00
|-  style="background:#cfc;"
| 2021-04-09|| Win ||align=left| Kiewpayak Jitmuangnon || Muaymanwansuk Road Show || Songkhla, Thailand || Decision || 5 || 3:00
|-  style="background:#cfc;"
| 2021-03-11 || Win||align=left| Samingdet Nor.Anuwatgym|| True4U Muaymanwansuk, Rangsit Stadium || Pathum Thani, Thailand || Decision ||5 || 3:00
|-  style="background:#fbb;"
| 2020-12-18|| Loss ||align=left| ET Teeded99 || Singmawynn + MahaVajiravudh || Songkhla province, Thailand || KO (Flying knee)|| 3 ||
|-  style="background:#fbb;"
| 2020-11-22|| Loss ||align=left| ET Teeded99 || Channel 7 Stadium || Bangkok, Thailand || Decision || 5 || 3:00 
|-
! style=background:white colspan=9 |
|-  style="background:#fbb;"
| 2020-07-26|| Loss ||align=left| View Petchkoson || Channel 7 Stadium || Bangkok, Thailand || Decision || 5 || 3:00
|-  style="background:#cfc;"
| 2020-01-31|| Win ||align=left| Worawut MUden || Phuket Super Fight Real Muay Thai || Mueang Phuket District, Thailand || Decision || 5 || 3:00
|-  style="background:#cfc;"
| 2019-12-19|| Win||align=left| Petchsoontri Jitmuangnon  || Jitmuangnon, Rajadamnern Stadium || Bangkok, Thailand || Decision || 5 || 3:00
|-  style="background:#fbb;"
| 2019-10-29|| Loss||align=left| Kongthoranee Sor.Sommai  || Sangmorakot, Lumpinee Stadium ||Bangkok, Thailand || Decision || 5 || 3:00
|-  style="background:#cfc;"
| 2019-09-24|| Win||align=left| Pompetch Sitnumnoi  || Petchnumnoi + Prestige Fight, Lumpinee Stadium || Bangkok, Thailand || Decision || 5 || 3:00
|-  style="background:#fbb;"
| 2019-08-07|| Loss ||align=left| Kiewpayak Jitmuangnon  ||  Jitmuangnon, Rajadamnern Stadium || Bangkok, Thailand || Decision || 5 || 3:00
|-  style="background:#cfc;"
| 2019-06-06|| Win||align=left| Suriyanlek Por.Yenying  || OneSongchai, Rajadamnern Stadium || Bangkok, Thailand || Decision || 5 || 3:00
|-  style="background:#cfc;"
| 2019-05-09|| Win||align=left| Yothin FA Group || Petchyindee, Rajadamnern Stadium || Bangkok, Thailand || Decision  || 5 || 3:00
|-  style="background:#cfc;"
| 2019-03-28|| Win||align=left| Petchrung Sitnayokgaipadriew || Onesongchai, Rajadamnern Stadium || Bangkok, Thailand || Decision  || 5 || 3:00
|-  style="background:#fbb;"
| 2019-02-28|| Loss||align=left| Kiewpayak Jitmuangnon || PetchChaoPhraya, Rajadamnern Stadium || Bangkok, Thailand || Decision || 5 || 3:00
|-  style="background:#cfc;"
| 2019-02-01|| Win||align=left| Yothin FA Group || True4U Muaymanwansuk + Petchpiya, Lumpinee Stadium || Bangkok, Thailand || Decision  || 5 || 3:00
|-  style="background:#cfc;"
| 2018-12-26|| Win||align=left| Somraknoi Muayded789 || Petchyindee + One Championship, Rajadamnern Stadium 73rd Anniversary || Bangkok, Thailand || Decision  || 5 || 3:00
|-  style="background:#fbb;"
| 2018-11-21|| Loss ||align=left| Petchrung Sitnayokgaipadriew || Onesongchai, Rajadamnern Stadium || Bangkok, Thailand || Decision  || 5 || 3:00
|-  style="background:#cfc;"
| 2018-09-20|| Win||align=left| Morakot Petchseemuen || Onesongchai, Rajadamnern Stadium || Bangkok, Thailand || Decision  || 5 || 3:00
|-  style="background:#cfc;"
| 2018-08-30|| Win||align=left| Petchrung Sitnayokgaipadriew || Onesongchai, Rajadamnern Stadium || Bangkok, Thailand || Decision  || 5 || 3:00
|-  style="background:#cfc;"
| 2018-07-26|| Win ||align=left| Pichitchai PKsaenchaimuaythaigym || Onesongchai, Rajadamnern Stadium || Bangkok, Thailand || Decision  || 5 || 3:00
|-  style="background:#cfc;"
| 2018-06-06|| Win ||align=left| Prajanban SorJor.Vichitpaedriw || Onesongchai, Rajadamnern Stadium || Bangkok, Thailand || Decision  || 5 || 3:00
|-  style="background:#fbb;"
| 2018-05-03|| Loss ||align=left| Prajanban SorJor.Vichitpaedriw || Onesongchai, Rajadamnern Stadium || Bangkok, Thailand || Decision  || 5 || 3:00
|-  style="background:#cfc;"
| 2018-04-02|| Win ||align=left| Hanpon Gor.Suwantat || Onesongchai, Rajadamnern Stadium || Bangkok, Thailand || Decision  || 5 || 3:00
|-  style="background:#fbb;"
| 2018-03-05|| Loss ||align=left| Petchrung Sitnayokgaipadriew || Onesongchai, Rajadamnern Stadium || Bangkok, Thailand || Decision  || 5 || 3:00
|-  style="background:#cfc;"
| 2017-11-28|| Win||align=left| Puenkon Tor.Surat || Onesongchai, Lumpinee Stadium || Bangkok, Thailand || KO (High Kick) || 1 ||
|-  style="background:#cfc;"
| 2017-11-02|| Win||align=left| Kumandoi Petcharoenvit || Onesongchai, Rajadamnern Stadium || Bangkok, Thailand ||KO (High Kick)|| 3 ||
|-  style="background:#fbb;"
| 2017-07-13|| Loss||align=left| Padetseuk Gor.Gampanat || Onesongchai, Rajadamnern Stadium ||Bangkok, Thailand || Decision  || 5 || 3:00
|-  style="background:#cfc;"
| 2017-06-15|| Win||align=left| Yodkhuntap Sor.Gor.Sue-NgaiGym || Onesongchai, Rajadamnern Stadium || Bangkok, Thailand ||Decision  || 5 || 3:00
|-  style="background:#cfc;"
| 2017-03-19|| Win||align=left| Masuklek Ror.Kelacorath ||  Rangsit Stadium|| Rangsit, Thailand ||Decision  || 5 || 3:00
|-  style="background:#cfc;"
| 2017-02-05|| Win||align=left| Roichoeng Singmawin ||  Rangsit Stadium|| Rangsit, Thailand ||Decision  || 5 || 3:00
|-  style="background:#fbb;"
| 2016-12-10|| Loss ||align=left| Suriyanlek Or.Bor.Tor.Kampee ||  Montri Studio || Bangkok, Thailand ||KO || 3 ||
|-  style="background:#cfc;"
| 2016-10-13|| Win||align=left| Phetsoontri Jitmuangnon|| Rajadamnern Stadium || Bangkok, Thailand ||Decision  || 5 || 3:00
|-  style="background:#fbb;"
| 2016-09-05|| Loss||align=left| Yothin FA Group || Rajadamnern Stadium ||Bangkok, Thailand || Decision  || 5 || 3:00
|-
! style=background:white colspan=9 |
|-  style="background:#cfc;"
| 2016-08-05|| Win||align=left| Thepwarit RawaiMuayThai || True4U, Rangsit Stadium|| Rangsit, Thailand ||Decision  || 5 || 3:00
|-
! style=background:white colspan=9 |
|-  style="background:#cfc;"
| 2016-06-20|| Win||align=left| Achanai PetchyindeeAcademy|| Rajadamnern Stadium || Bangkok, Thailand ||Decision  || 5 || 3:00
|-  style="background:#cfc;"
| 2016-05-14 || Win||align=left| Rungkit Wor.Sanprapai || True4U, Rangsit Stadium || Rangsit, Thailand || Decision || 5 || 3:00
|-  style="background:#cfc;"
| 2016-03-05|| Win ||align=left| Yothin FA Group || True4U, Rangsit Stadium || Rangsit, Thailand || KO || 4 ||
|-  style="background:#cfc;"
| 2016-02-13|| Win||align=left| Thepwarit RawaiMuayThai ||  || Phetchaburi Province, Thailand ||Decision  || 5 || 3:00
|-  style="background:#cfc;"
| 2016-01-16|| Win||align=left| Khongfak Sitpuphandom ||  || Phetchaburi Province, Thailand ||Decision  || 5 || 3:00
|-  style="background:#cfc;"
| 2015-12-13|| Win||align=left| Khongfak Sitpuphandom || Ladprao Stadium ||  Thailand ||Decision  || 5 || 3:00
|-  style="background:#fbb;"
| 2015-10-11|| Loss||align=left| Veeraponlek Wor.Wanchai || Ladprao Stadium ||  Thailand ||Decision  || 5 || 3:00
|-  style="background:#fbb;"
| 2015-09-20|| Loss||align=left| Yod ET Teded99 || Ladprao Stadium ||  Thailand ||Decision  || 5 || 3:00
|-  style="background:#fbb;"
| 2015-08-21|| Loss||align=left| Nongyot Sitjekan || Lumpinee Stadium ||  Bangkok, Thailand ||Decision  || 5 || 3:00
|-  style="background:#fbb;"
| 2015-07-08|| Loss||align=left| Phetwason Or.Daokrajai || Rajadamnern Stadium || Bangkok, Thailand ||Decision  || 5 || 3:00
|-  style="background:#fbb;"
| 2015-06-03|| Loss||align=left| Nongyot Sitjekan ||Rajadamnern Stadium || Bangkok, Thailand ||Decision  || 5 || 3:00
|-  style="background:#cfc;"
| 2015-03-25|| Win||align=left| Achanai PetchyindeeAcademy|| Rajadamnern Stadium || Bangkok, Thailand ||Decision  || 5 || 3:00
|-  style="background:#cfc;"
| 2015-02-18|| Win||align=left| Sendet Muangnongbua|| Rajadamnern Stadium || Bangkok, Thailand ||Decision  || 5 || 3:00
|-  style="background:#cfc;"
| 2015-01-25|| Win||align=left| Phetchiangkwan Nayoksomdet|| Rajadamnern Stadium || Bangkok, Thailand ||Decision  || 5 || 3:00
|-
| colspan=9 | Legend:    

|-  style="background:#cfc;"
| 2022-06-04|| Win ||align=left| Yernat Smagulov || IFMA Senior World Championships 2022, Final|| Abu Dhabi, United Arab Emirates || Decision (Unanimous) || 3 || 3:00 
|-
! style=background:white colspan=9 |

|-  style="background:#cfc;"
| 2022-06-02|| Win ||align=left| Serkan Koc || IFMA Senior World Championships 2022, Semi Finals|| Abu Dhabi, United Arab Emirates || Decision (Unanimous) || 3 || 3:00

|-  style="background:#cfc;"
| 2022-05-31||Win||align=left| Aldo Leone || IFMA Senior World Championships 2022, Quarter Finals|| Abu Dhabi, United Arab Emirates || TKO (Body shot) || 2 || 

|-  style="background:#cfc;"
| 2022-05-30||Win||align=left| Mohamed Almihdawi || IFMA Senior World Championships 2022, Second Round|| Abu Dhabi, United Arab Emirates || KO ||  || 

|-  style="background:#cfc;"
| 2022-05-28||Win||align=left| Tomas Tadlanek || IFMA Senior World Championships 2022, First Round|| Abu Dhabi, United Arab Emirates || Decision (Unanimous) || 3 ||3:00 

|-
| colspan=9 | Legend:

References

Kompatak SinbiMuayThai
Living people
1998 births
Kompatak SinbiMuayThai